Antihepialus keniae is a species of moth of the family Hepialidae described by William Jacob Holland in 1892. It is known from Kenya, Tanzania and Uganda.

References

External links
Hepialidae genera

Moths described in 1892
Hepialidae